Cainnech, Gaelic-Irish given name.

Cainnech appears to have belonged to that class of Irish names which were suitable for both sexes (Flann (Irish name), Ceallach, Fedelm (Irish name)). Two early male saints bore this name including Cainnech of Aghaboe (515/16–600) and the more obscure Cainnech of Achad Raithin. However, several woman have also borne this name.

Etymology

Cainnech or Cainneach comes from the Irish word caoin meaning kind, gentle, good or attractive. It is related to the female name Cainnear or Cainder which shares a similar etymology and means 'kind or gentle daughter''' (literally caoin + der in Irish)

Bearers of the name

 Caineach inion Urchadh, Queen of Connacht, fl. early 10th century.
 Cainnech ingen Canannán, Queen of Ireland, died 929.
 Cainnech of Achad Raithin in Munster, a male'' Irish saint, feast day 28 November.

References

External links
 

Irish-language feminine given names